If I Were You is a 2006 Brazilian comedy film  directed by Daniel Filho.

The film was a box office success, having the largest audience of a Brazilian film in 2006. It was followed by the sequel Se Eu Fosse Você 2 (2009).

Plot 
The film follows the story of Cláudio, a successful publicist who owns his own agency, and Helena, his wife, a music teacher who takes care of a children's choir. Accustomed to the day-by-day marriage routine, they occasionally argue. One day they have a bigger fight than normal, which causes something inexplicable to happen: they switch bodies. Terrified, Claudio and Helena try to appear normal until they can reverse the situation. But to do so they will have to fully assume each other's lives.

Cast
 Gloria Pires as Helena/Claudio
 Tony Ramos as Cláudio / Helena
 Lavínia Vlasak as Bárbara
 Thiago Lacerda as Marcos
 Glória Menezes as Vivinha
 Lara Rodrigues as Bia
 Danielle Winits as Cibelle
 Patrícia Pillar as Dr. Cris
 Maria Gladys as Cida
 Ary Fontoura as Priest
 Helena Fernandes as Débora
 Maria Ceiça as Márcia
 Leandro Hassum as Maurício

Soundtrack

References

External links
 

2000s fantasy comedy films
Body swapping in films
Brazilian fantasy comedy films
Films directed by Daniel Filho
Films shot in Rio de Janeiro (city)
2006 comedy films
2006 films
2000s Portuguese-language films